The 1999–2000 Philadelphia Flyers season was the Philadelphia Flyers' 33rd season in the National Hockey League (NHL). One of the most tumultuous seasons in franchise history, the Flyers reached the Eastern Conference Finals, losing in seven games to the New Jersey Devils, blowing a 3-1 series lead in the process.

Off-season
After going unclaimed in the 1999 NHL Expansion Draft, longtime goaltender Ron Hextall was waived by the Flyers on July 1 for the purpose of buying out the final season of his contract. Hextall cleared waivers and announced his retirement on September 6, 1999.

Longtime broadcaster Gene Hart, who was awarded the Foster Hewitt Memorial Award in 1997, died from a variety of illnesses on July 14.

A little over a week later on July 23, defenseman Dmitri Tertyshny, coming off his rookie season, was fatally injured in a boating accident. Tertyshny was on a boating trip to Okanagan Lake in British Columbia with two players from the Flyers' minor-league affiliate Philadelphia Phantoms, Francis Belanger and Mikhail Chernov, when a freak accident caused him to suffer fatal injuries. The boat hit a wave and caused him to fall forward overboard. The boat ran over him and its propeller slashed his neck and his jugular vein.

Regular season
Head coach Roger Neilson was diagnosed with bone cancer, forcing him to step aside in February 2000 to undergo treatment, so assistant coach Craig Ramsay took over as interim coach for the rest of the season; Neilson later recovered but was informed that he would not be returning.

In January, longtime Flyer and fan favorite Rod Brind'Amour was shipped to the Carolina Hurricanes for Keith Primeau, with the intention of acquiring a big center to complement Eric Lindros. Meanwhile, the strife between Flyers management (particularly GM Bob Clarke) and Lindros, continued to worsen. Less than a month after Ramsay took over, Lindros suffered his second concussion of the season. He played several games after the initial hit and afterwards criticized the team's training staff for failing to initially diagnose the concussion after it happened. It was after this that the Flyers' organization decided to strip Lindros of the captaincy on March 27 and name defenseman Eric Desjardins the team's captain.

With Lindros out indefinitely, the Flyers rallied to overcome the distractions and a 15-point deficit in the standings to win the Atlantic Division and the No. 1 seed in the East on the last day of the regular season.

Season standings

Playoffs
They easily defeated their first round opponent, the Buffalo Sabres, in five games. Primeau's goal in the fifth overtime of Game 4 against the team's second-round opponent, the Pittsburgh Penguins, turned that series in the Flyers' favor as they won in six games, coming back from a 2–0 series deficit. After dropping Game 1 to New Jersey in the Eastern Conference Finals, the Flyers peeled off three straight wins to take a 3–1 series lead. But New Jersey refused to give up. After New Jersey won Game 5, Lindros returned to the lineup for the first time since March for Game 6 in another losing effort. Early in Game 7, Lindros was on the receiving end of a hit by Scott Stevens, giving him another concussion and leaving the Philadelphia crowd deflated. Without Lindros, the Flyers lost the decisive game by a score of 2–1. To date, it is the only time (of 64 total series) a team in the Conference Finals or Semifinals round has held a 3-1 series lead and lost. It was the second time in franchise history the team lost a series after leading 3 games to 1. New Jersey went on to win the Stanley Cup.

Schedule and results

Preseason

|- style="background:#fcf;"
| 1 || September 17 || @ Washington Capitals || 2–3 || 0–1–0 ||
|- style="background:#fcf;"
| 2 || September 18 || Detroit Red Wings || 2–5 || 0–2–0 ||
|- style="background:#cfc;"
| – || September 21 || @ Philadelphia Phantoms || 6–1 || – ||
|- style="background:#fcf;"
| 3 || September 23 || @ New York Rangers || 1–2 || 0–3–0 ||
|- style="background:#cfc;"
| 4 || September 24 || New York Rangers || 3–2 || 1–3–0 ||
|- style="background:#fcf;"
| 5 || September 25 || @ New Jersey Devils || 2–4 || 1–4–0 ||
|- style="background:#cfc;"
| 6 || September 26 || New Jersey Devils || 10–2 || 2–4–0 ||
|- style="background:#fcf;"
| 7 || September 27 || Washington Capitals || 2–8 || 2–5–0 ||
|- style="background:#fcf;"
| 8 || September 28 || @ Detroit Red Wings || 0–3 || 2–6–0 ||
|-
| colspan="6" style="text-align:center;"|
Notes:
 Benefit game played for Dmitri Tertyshny's family at the First Union Spectrum.
 This game was not counted toward the team's preseason totals.
|-

|-
| Legend:

Regular season

|- style="background:#fcf;"
| 1 || October 2 || Ottawa Senators || 0–3 || 0–1–0–0 || 0 || 
|- style="background:#fcf;"
| 2 || October 7 || Carolina Hurricanes || 0–2 || 0–2–0–0 || 0 || 
|- style="background:#ffc;"
| 3 || October 9 || @ Boston Bruins || 1–1 OT || 0–2–1–0 || 1 || 
|- style="background:#fcf;"
| 4 || October 12 || @ Washington Capitals || 4–5 || 0–3–1–0 || 1 || 
|-
| 5 || October 14 || Montreal Canadiens || 4–5 OT || 0–3–1–1 || 2 || 
|- style="background:#fcf;"
| 6 || October 16 || @ Detroit Red Wings || 2–3 || 0–4–1–1 || 2 || 
|- style="background:#cfc;"
| 7 || October 17 || Buffalo Sabres || 5–2 || 1–4–1–1 || 4 || 
|- style="background:#cfc;"
| 8 || October 20 || New York Rangers || 5–0 || 2–4–1–1 || 6 || 
|- style="background:#cfc;"
| 9 || October 22 || @ New York Rangers || 2–0 || 3–4–1–1 || 8 || 
|- style="background:#cfc;"
| 10 || October 24 || Florida Panthers || 2–0 || 4–4–1–1 || 10 || 
|- style="background:#fcf;"
| 11 || October 26 || Vancouver Canucks || 2–5 || 4–5–1–1 || 10 || 
|- style="background:#cfc;"
| 12 || October 28 || Colorado Avalanche || 5–4 OT || 5–5–1–1 || 12 || 
|- style="background:#cfc;"
| 13 || October 30 || New Jersey Devils || 5–3 || 6–5–1–1 || 14 || 
|-

|- style="background:#ffc;"
| 14 || November 3 || @ Mighty Ducks of Anaheim || 3–3 OT || 6–5–2–1 || 15 || 
|- style="background:#cfc;"
| 15 || November 5 || @ San Jose Sharks || 3–1 || 7–5–2–1 || 17 || 
|- style="background:#cfc;"
| 16 || November 6 || @ Los Angeles Kings || 5–3 || 8–5–2–1 || 19 || 
|- style="background:#fcf;"
| 17 || November 9 || @ New Jersey Devils || 1–2 || 8–6–2–1 || 19 || 
|- style="background:#cfc;"
| 18 || November 11 || Carolina Hurricanes || 4–1 || 9–6–2–1 || 21 || 
|- style="background:#cfc;"
| 19 || November 13 || San Jose Sharks || 3–2 || 10–6–2–1 || 23 || 
|- style="background:#ffc;"
| 20 || November 18 || Dallas Stars || 1–1 OT || 10–6–3–1 || 24 || 
|- style="background:#cfc;"
| 21 || November 20 || Tampa Bay Lightning || 4–1 || 11–6–3–1 || 26 || 
|- style="background:#fcf;"
| 22 || November 22 || @ Tampa Bay Lightning || 1–4 || 11–7–3–1 || 26 || 
|- style="background:#cfc;"
| 23 || November 24 || @ Florida Panthers || 6–1 || 12–7–3–1 || 28 || 
|- style="background:#cfc;"
| 24 || November 26 || Toronto Maple Leafs || 3–2 OT || 13–7–3–1 || 30 || 
|- style="background:#ffc;"
| 25 || November 28 || @ Ottawa Senators || 3–3 OT || 13–7–4–1 || 31 || 
|-

|- style="background:#cfc;"
| 26 || December 2 || @ Buffalo Sabres || 4–2 || 14–7–4–1 || 33 || 
|- style="background:#cfc;"
| 27 || December 4 || @ Montreal Canadiens || 3–2 || 15–7–4–1 || 35 || 
|- style="background:#cfc;"
| 28 || December 5 || St. Louis Blues || 3–2 || 16–7–4–1 || 37 || 
|- style="background:#cfc;"
| 29 || December 9 || Toronto Maple Leafs || 4–2 || 17–7–4–1 || 39 || 
|- style="background:#fcf;"
| 30 || December 11 || @ Toronto Maple Leafs || 4–6 || 17–8–4–1 || 39 || 
|- style="background:#fcf;"
| 31 || December 14 || @ Buffalo Sabres || 1–3 || 17–9–4–1 || 39 || 
|- style="background:#cfc;"
| 32 || December 16 || Phoenix Coyotes || 5–3 || 18–9–4–1 || 41 || 
|- style="background:#cfc;"
| 33 || December 18 || Tampa Bay Lightning || 4–0 || 19–9–4–1 || 43 || 
|- style="background:#ffc;"
| 34 || December 19 || Nashville Predators || 1–1 OT || 19–9–5–1 || 44 || 
|- style="background:#fcf;"
| 35 || December 22 || @ New Jersey Devils || 2–3 || 19–10–5–1 || 44 || 
|- style="background:#ffc;"
| 36 || December 23 || Atlanta Thrashers || 4–4 OT || 19–10–6–1 || 45 || 
|- style="background:#cfc;"
| 37 || December 27 || @ Calgary Flames || 5–1 || 20–10–6–1 || 47 || 
|- style="background:#cfc;"
| 38 || December 29 || @ Vancouver Canucks || 3–2 OT || 21–10–6–1 || 49 || 
|-

|- style="background:#cfc;"
| 39 || January 2 || @ New York Islanders || 4–1 || 22–10–6–1 || 51 || 
|- style="background:#cfc;"
| 40 || January 6 || New York Islanders || 3–2 || 23–10–6–1 || 53 || 
|- style="background:#cfc;"
| 41 || January 8 || Pittsburgh Penguins || 6–2 || 24–10–6–1 || 55 || 
|- style="background:#cfc;"
| 42 || January 11 || @ Carolina Hurricanes || 4–3 || 25–10–6–1 || 57 || 
|- style="background:#fcf;"
| 43 || January 14 || @ Atlanta Thrashers || 0–1 || 25–11–6–1 || 57 || 
|- style="background:#fcf;"
| 44 || January 15 || New Jersey Devils || 1–4 || 25–12–6–1 || 57 || 
|- style="background:#fcf;"
| 45 || January 17 || @ Florida Panthers || 1–3 || 25–13–6–1 || 57 || 
|- style="background:#ffc;"
| 46 || January 20 || Ottawa Senators || 1–1 OT || 25–13–7–1 || 58 || 
|- style="background:#ffc;"
| 47 || January 23 || @ Pittsburgh Penguins || 4–4 OT || 25–13–8–1 || 59 || 
|- style="background:#cfc;"
| 48 || January 27 || Florida Panthers || 4–2 || 26–13–8–1 || 61 || 
|- style="background:#ffc;"
| 49 || January 29 || @ Montreal Canadiens || 2–2 OT || 26–13–9–1 || 62 || 
|- style="background:#fcf;"
| 50 || January 30 || @ Washington Capitals || 0–2 || 26–14–9–1 || 62 || 
|-

|- style="background:#ffc;"
| 51 || February 3 || Mighty Ducks of Anaheim || 3–3 OT || 26–14–10–1 || 63 || 
|- style="background:#cfc;"
| 52 || February 9 || @ Toronto Maple Leafs || 4–2 || 27–14–10–1 || 65 || 
|- style="background:#fcf;"
| 53 || February 10 || Edmonton Oilers || 2–3 || 27–15–10–1 || 65 || 
|- style="background:#cfc;"
| 54 || February 12 || Buffalo Sabres || 3–2 OT || 28–15–10–1 || 67 || 
|- style="background:#fcf;"
| 55 || February 15 || @ New Jersey Devils || 2–4 || 28–16–10–1 || 67 || 
|- style="background:#ffc;"
| 56 || February 17 || New York Islanders || 2–2 OT || 28–16–11–1 || 68 || 
|- style="background:#cfc;"
| 57 || February 19 || Washington Capitals || 4–2 || 29–16–11–1 || 70 || 
|- style="background:#cfc;"
| 58 || February 20 || @ New York Rangers || 3–2 || 30–16–11–1 || 72 || 
|- style="background:#cfc;"
| 59 || February 22 || Chicago Blackhawks || 3–1 || 31–16–11–1 || 74 || 
|- style="background:#cfc;"
| 60 || February 24 || Pittsburgh Penguins || 4–3 OT || 32–16–11–1 || 76 || 
|- style="background:#cfc;"
| 61 || February 26 || @ New York Islanders || 5–1 || 33–16–11–1 || 78 || 
|- style="background:#fcf;"
| 62 || February 29 || @ St. Louis Blues || 2–3 || 33–17–11–1 || 78 || 
|-

|- style="background:#fcf;"
| 63 || March 1 || @ Dallas Stars || 0–2 || 33–18–11–1 || 78 || 
|- style="background:#cfc;"
| 64 || March 4 || @ Boston Bruins || 3–0 || 34–18–11–1 || 80 || 
|-
| 65 || March 5 || New York Islanders || 3–4 OT || 34–18–11–2 || 81 || 
|- style="background:#cfc;"
| 66 || March 8 || @ Tampa Bay Lightning || 3–2 OT || 35–18–11–2 || 83 || 
|- style="background:#cfc;"
| 67 || March 9 || Washington Capitals || 3–1 || 36–18–11–2 || 85 || 
|- style="background:#fcf;"
| 68 || March 12 || @ Colorado Avalanche || 1–3 || 36–19–11–2 || 85 || 
|- style="background:#cfc;"
| 69 || March 13 || @ Phoenix Coyotes || 4–1 || 37–19–11–2 || 87 || 
|- style="background:#ffc;"
| 70 || March 16 || Montreal Canadiens || 1–1 OT || 37–19–12–2 || 88 || 
|- style="background:#fcf;"
| 71 || March 18 || New York Rangers || 2–3 || 37–20–12–2 || 88 || 
|- style="background:#cfc;"
| 72 || March 19 || Boston Bruins || 6–2 || 38–20–12–2 || 90 || 
|- style="background:#cfc;"
| 73 || March 21 || @ Nashville Predators || 2–0 || 39–20–12–2 || 92 || 
|-
| 74 || March 23 || Los Angeles Kings || 2–3 OT || 39–20–12–3 || 93 || 
|- style="background:#cfc;"
| 75 || March 26 || Pittsburgh Penguins || 3–1 || 40–20–12–3 || 95 || 
|- style="background:#fcf;"
| 76 || March 28 || @ Ottawa Senators || 2–5 || 40–21–12–3 || 95 || 
|-

|- style="background:#cfc;"
| 77 || April 1 || @ Pittsburgh Penguins || 3–2 || 41–21–12–3 || 97 || 
|- style="background:#fcf;"
| 78 || April 2 || @ Carolina Hurricanes || 0–1 || 41–22–12–3 || 97 || 
|- style="background:#cfc;"
| 79 || April 4 || @ Atlanta Thrashers || 5–3 || 42–22–12–3 || 99 || 
|- style="background:#cfc;"
| 80 || April 6 || Atlanta Thrashers || 3–1 || 43–22–12–3 || 101 || 
|- style="background:#cfc;"
| 81 || April 8 || Boston Bruins || 3–0 || 44–22–12–3 || 103 || 
|- style="background:#cfc;"
| 82 || April 9 || @ New York Rangers || 4–1 || 45–22–12–3 || 105 || 
|-

|-
| Legend:

Playoffs

|- style="background:#cfc;"
| 1 || April 13 || Buffalo Sabres || 3–2 || 19,607 || Flyers lead 1–0 || 
|- style="background:#cfc;"
| 2 || April 14 || Buffalo Sabres || 2–1 || 19,752 || Flyers lead 2–0 || 
|- style="background:#cfc;"
| 3 || April 16 || @ Buffalo Sabres || 2–0 || 18,690 || Flyers lead 3–0 || 
|- style="background:#fcf;"
| 4 || April 18 || @ Buffalo Sabres || 2–3 OT || 18,690 || Flyers lead 3–1 || 
|- style="background:#cfc;"
| 5 || April 20 || Buffalo Sabres || 5–2 || 19,801 || Flyers win 4–1 || 
|-

|- style="background:#fcf;"
| 1 || April 27 || Pittsburgh Penguins || 0–2 || 19,846 || Penguins lead 1–0 || 
|- style="background:#fcf;"
| 2 || April 29 || Pittsburgh Penguins || 1–4 || 19,810 || Penguins lead 2–0 || 
|- style="background:#cfc;"
| 3 || May 2 || @ Pittsburgh Penguins || 4–3 OT || 17,148 || Penguins lead 2–1 || 
|- style="background:#cfc;"
| 4 || May 4 || @ Pittsburgh Penguins || 2–1 5OT || 17,148 || Series tied 2–2 || 
|- style="background:#cfc;"
| 5 || May 7 || Pittsburgh Penguins || 6–3 || 19,906 || Flyers lead 3–2 || 
|- style="background:#cfc;"
| 6 || May 9 || @ Pittsburgh Penguins || 2–1 || 17,114 || Flyers win 4–2 || 
|-

|- style="background:#fcf;"
| 1 || May 14 || New Jersey Devils || 1–4 || 19,779 || Devils lead 1–0 || 
|- style="background:#cfc;"
| 2 || May 16 || New Jersey Devils || 4–3 || 19,855 || Series tied 1–1 || 
|- style="background:#cfc;"
| 3 || May 18 || @ New Jersey Devils || 4–2 || 19,040 || Flyers lead 2–1 || 
|- style="background:#cfc;"
| 4 || May 20 || @ New Jersey Devils || 3–1 || 19,040 || Flyers lead 3–1 || 
|- style="background:#fcf;"
| 5 || May 22 || New Jersey Devils || 1–4 || 19,945 || Flyers lead 3–2 || 
|- style="background:#fcf;"
| 6 || May 24 || @ New Jersey Devils || 1–2 || 19,040 || Series tied 3–3 || 
|- style="background:#fcf;"
| 7 || May 26 || New Jersey Devils || 1–2 || 20,037 || Devils win 4–3 || 
|-

|-
| Legend:

Player statistics

Scoring
 Position abbreviations: C = Center; D = Defense; G = Goaltender; LW = Left Wing; RW = Right Wing
  = Joined team via a transaction (e.g., trade, waivers, signing) during the season. Stats reflect time with the Flyers only.
  = Left team via a transaction (e.g., trade, waivers, release) during the season. Stats reflect time with the Flyers only.

Goaltending

Awards and records

Awards

Records

Among the team records set during the 1999–2000 season was goaltender John Vanbiesbrouck setting the team record for consecutive shutouts (3) from October 20 to October 24, which was later tied by Ilya Bryzgalov during the 2011–12 season. Eric Desjardins tied the team season record for powerplay goals by a defenseman (8) and the team set a franchise record for fewest overtime losses (3), a mark that was matched in the following two seasons.

During the third period of game two of their conference semifinals playoff series with the Pittsburgh Penguins, Rick Tocchet set team playoff records for most penalties (5) and penalty minutes (29) in a single period, while the team’s 92 penalty minutes is also a franchise high. The Flyers game four victory in the fifth overtime period is the longest in team history (152 minutes and seven seconds) and also holds the team record for most shorts on goal during playoff overtime (43). In game five, Andy Delmore’s hat trick tied an NHL record for most goals by a defenseman in a playoff game while Mark Recchi tied the team record for most assists in a playoff game (4). The Flyers five-game road winning streak from May 2 to May 20 tied a franchise playoff record. Delmore’s five goals during the playoffs is the most by a Flyers defenseman.

Transactions
The Flyers were involved in the following transactions from June 20, 1999, the day after the deciding game of the 1999 Stanley Cup Finals, through June 10, 2000, the day of the deciding game of the 2000 Stanley Cup Finals.

Trades

Players acquired

Players lost

Signings

Draft picks

Philadelphia's picks at the 1999 NHL Entry Draft, which was held at the FleetCenter in Boston on June 26, 1999. The Flyers traded their second-round pick, 58th overall, the New York Islanders' 2000 sixth-round pick, and Dainius Zubrus to the Montreal Canadiens for Mark Recchi on March 10, 1999. They also traded their fifth-round pick, 148th overall, and Colin Forbes to the Tampa Bay Lightning for Mikael Andersson and Sandy McCarthy on March 20, 1999, their eighth-round pick, 237th overall, to the Carolina Hurricanes for the rights to Francis Lessard on May 25, 1999, and their ninth-round pick, 265th overall, to the Dallas Stars for the Stars' 1998 ninth-round pick on June 27, 1998. The St. Louis Blues received the Flyers' sixth-round pick, 180th overall, as compensation for the Flyers hiring Roger Neilson as their head coach.

Farm teams
The Flyers were affiliated with the Philadelphia Phantoms of the AHL and the Trenton Titans of the ECHL.

Notes

References
General
 
 
 
Specific

External links
 

1999–2000 NHL season by team
1999–2000 in American ice hockey by team
1999
Philadelphia
Philadelphia